Earlyvale Gate railway station served the Dundas family residence in Earlyvale, Scottish Borders, Scotland for 8 months (June 1856 - February 1857) on the Peebles Railway.

History 
The station opened in June 1856 by the Peebles Railway. The station was situated on the west side of an unnamed minor road. James Hay Mackenzie, son of the Peebles Railway director William Forbes Mackenzie, wrote to the PR board on behalf of a friend, George Dundas, who was planning to move his family into a house in Earlyvale Gate. He requested that trains should stop at the level crossing for the Dundas family to use them. He asked the PR to either build a station or provide morning and evening trains to stop at the crossing. In return, Dundas promised to bring goods traffic on the line with his family and friends bringing in the revenue from the line. Arrangements were made to stop the trains on Tuesday, Wednesday and Thursday (the market days). Any passengers had to inform the gatekeeper at Earlyvale so they could hoist the red stop signal and returning passengers had to notify the guard at Leadburn. The station was closed to passengers on 28 February 1857.

References

External links 

Disused railway stations in the Scottish Borders
Former North British Railway stations
Railway stations in Great Britain opened in 1856
Railway stations in Great Britain closed in 1857
1856 establishments in Scotland